Events from the year 1783 in art.

Events
 Thomas Gainsborough removes a set of 15 portraits of King George III of Great Britain and the royal family from the Royal Academy summer exhibition in London and places them at Schomberg House, his home.

Works

 Marie-Gabrielle Capet – Self-portrait
 John Singleton Copley
 The Death of Major Peirson, 6 January 1781
 The Defeat of the Floating Batteries at Gibraltar, September 1782
 Thomas Gainsborough – Her Grace Georgiana Cavendish, Duchess of Devonshire
 Thomas Jones – A Storm – Prospero, Miranda and Caliban Spying the Shipwrecked Ferdinand
 Joseph Lange – Unfinished portrait of Wolfgang Amadeus Mozart, his brother-in-law
 Sir Joshua Reynolds
 Admiral Hood
 The Nativity (West window of chapel, New College, Oxford, England, design after Correggio, painted by Thomas Jervais)
 Alexander Roslin – The artist Anne Vallayer-Coster
 Pierre-Henri de Valenciennes – At the Villa Farnèse – Two Poplars
 Louise Élisabeth Vigée Le Brun
 Portrait of Marie Antoinette (the "muslin" portrait)
 Marie Antoinette with a Rose
 Thomas Whitcombe – The Battle of the Saintes, 12th April 1782: surrender of the Ville de Paris

Births
 January 2 – Christoffer Wilhelm Eckersberg, Danish painter (died 1853)
 January 4 – Aleksander Lauréus, Finnish painter (died 1823)
 February 10 – Fyodor Petrovich Tolstoy, Russian painter, engraver and silhouettist (died 1873)
 March 25 – Jean-Baptiste Paulin Guérin, French painter (died 1855)
 April 5 – Andrew Geddes, British painter (died 1844)
 April 29 – David Cox, English landscape painter (died 1859)
 May 29 – Benedetto Pistrucci, Italian-born British engraver (died 1855)
 June 19 – Thomas Sully, English-born American portrait painter (died 1872)
 September 17 – Samuel Prout, English water-colour painter (died 1852)
 October 4 – Jens Peter Møller, Danish painter (died 1854)
 December 14 – Alexandre-François Caminade, French portraitist and a religion painter (died 1862)
 December 18 – Johan Niclas Byström, Swedish sculptor (died 1844)
 date unknown
 Maria Johanna Görtz, Swedish still life artist (died 1853)
 Alexander Johann Dallinger von Dalling, Austrian painter (died 1844)
 Yi Jaegwan, Korean genre works painter in the late Joseon period (died 1837)

Deaths
 January 24 – George Michael Moser, Swiss-born enameller (born 1706)
 March 26 - Anna Rosina de Gasc, German portrait painter (born 1713)
 April 12 – Johann Melchior Kambly, Swiss sculptor who took part in the development of the architectural style of Frederician Rococo (born 1718)
 April 14 – Jacques-Philippe Le Bas, French engraver (born 1707)<ref>*Roger Portalis & Henri Béraldi. Les graveurs du dix-huitième siècle, Vol. 2, pt. 2 (Helman to Marais) (Paris D. Morgand et C. Fatout, 1880) pp. 564–592</ref>
 May 26 – Anna Maria Hilfeling, Swedish portrait miniaturist artist (born 1713)
 July 8 – Johann Jakob Zeiller, Austrian fresco painter (born 1708)
 August 4 – Johannes Rach, Danish painter and draughtsman (born 1720)
 August 19 – Franz Xaver Messerschmidt, German sculptor most famous for his collection of busts of faces contorted in extreme facial expressions (born 1736)
 August 29 – William Wynne Ryland, English engraver (born 1738)
 November 19 – Jean-Baptiste Perronneau, French painter who specialized in portraits executed in pastels (born 1715)
 date unknown''
 Matthijs Accama, Dutch historical and emblematical subjects painter (born 1702)
 Benjamin Calau, German portrait painter who used an encaustic technique (died 1724)
 Jean-Baptiste Defernex, French sculptor especially of portrait busts (born 1729)
 Violante Beatrice Siries, Italian painter (born 1709)

References

 
Years of the 18th century in art
1780s in art